Wickes is a home improvement retailer and garden centre, based in the United Kingdom with more than 230 stores throughout the country. Its main business is the sale of supplies and materials, for homeowners and the building trade. It is listed on the London Stock Exchange.

History

Wickes was founded by Henry Dunn Wickes, in Michigan, United States in 1854, and in 1972, Wickes Corporation, along with British builders merchant, Sankeys, opened its first store in the United Kingdom. By 1987, Wickes was trading from forty one locations, and was floated on the London Stock Exchange under the leadership of CEO, Henry Sweetbaum. Serious accounting irregularities, involving the overstatement of profits, were uncovered in June 1996.

In November 1996, Bill Grimsey was appointed CEO, to oversee its recovery from the scandal, that saw its share price suspended and the banks foreclosing. In January 1997, Grimsey launched a rights issue, started an employee share scheme, and turned around the company to the point where it was bought by Focus Do It All, backed by Duke Street Capital, in September 2000.

Wickes grew from 131 stores in October 2000 to 172 in March 2004, including the rebranding of 36 stores of Focus DIY. Focus Group sold Wickes to Travis Perkins in December 2004. The sale was completed in February 2005.

Wickes acquired seven stores from Focus DIY in October 2007, after Cerberus Capital took it over in June 2007 for £1; these stores were in Glossop, Mansfield, Penrith, Bulwell, Plumstead, Dumfries and Hereford.

In December 1996, the management of Wickes decided to cut back its operations in France, Belgium and the Netherlands and to concentrate solely on its operations in the United Kingdom. All mainland operations in Europe were sold to the French do it yourself chain, Bricorama, in June 1997. The company's joint venture in South Africa ended in February 1997. 

In May 2011, it was announced that Wickes had purchased thirteen stores from the appointed administrators of Focus DIY, Ernst & Young, saving 345 jobs. By 2017, the company had over two hundred stores in the United Kingdom. In October 2016, Wickes announced plans to shut stores amid ‘uncertain trading’.

The company had entered into a franchise agreement for the Wickes brand to be operated in Ireland by a subsidiary of Moritz Holdings, an Irish developer. The first store opened in Limerick. Moritz had planned to open fifteen stores within five years, but initial plans for a €30 million expansion were later put on hold, pending an assessment of market conditions, in April 2009. The franchise relationship ended in February 2013, with the store closed down, and the liquidator was “denied access” to the store.

In May 2018, BBC News Online reported that Wickes planned to cut a third of its head office workforce in a bid to reduce costs. Parent company Travis Perkins said the cuts would affect workers in Watford, Hertfordshire, where it employed three hundred people.

In July 2019, along with reports of sales being up 9.7%, the parent company of Wickes, Travis Perkins, announced plans to action a demerger and spin off Wickes, quoting Wickes "is well positioned to thrive as a stand alone business" and "will have the autonomy to execute on its strategy and allocate capital to its customer proposition and growth opportunities with a clearer focus." In April 2021, it was confirmed that Wickes would be demerged from Travis Perkins by the end of the month.

The demerger was completed on 28 April 2021, with Wickes Group plc launching on the London Stock Exchange.

References

External links
 
Retail companies established in 1854
Home improvement companies of the United Kingdom
1854 establishments in England
2000 mergers and acquisitions
2004 mergers and acquisitions